Adrien Bossel (born 28 December 1986) is a Swiss tennis player.

Bossel has a career-high ATP singles ranking of number 262 achieved on 10 August 2015. He also has a career-high ATP doubles ranking of no. 401 achieved on 15 October 2012.

Bossel made his ATP main-draw debut at the 2012 Swiss Indoors in the doubles event partnering Henri Laaksonen, but they lost in the first round to Kevin Anderson and Viktor Troicki.
 
At the 2013 Hall of Fame Tennis Championships, Bossel qualified for the tournament by defeating Adam Feeney, Denys Molchanov and Érik Chvojka in the qualifying rounds. In the main draw, he lost to the eighth seed Rajeev Ram.

External links
 
 

1986 births
Living people
Swiss male tennis players
People from Fribourg
Sportspeople from the canton of Fribourg